In chemistry, nuclear physics, and particle physics, inelastic scattering is a fundamental scattering process in which the kinetic energy of an incident particle is not conserved (in contrast to elastic scattering). In an inelastic scattering process, some of the energy of the incident particle is lost or increased.  Although the term is historically related to the concept of inelastic collision in dynamics, the two concepts are quite distinct; inelastic collision in dynamics refers to processes in which the total macroscopic kinetic energy is not conserved. In general, scattering due to inelastic collisions will be inelastic, but, since elastic collisions often transfer kinetic energy between particles, scattering due to elastic collisions can also be inelastic, as in Compton scattering meaning the two particles in the collision transfer energy causing a loss of energy in one particle.

Electrons
When an electron is the incident particle, the probability of inelastic scattering, depending on the energy of the incident electron, is usually smaller than that of elastic scattering. Thus in the case of gas electron diffraction (GED), reflection high-energy electron diffraction (RHEED), and transmission electron diffraction, because the energy of the incident electron is high, the contribution of inelastic electron scattering can be ignored. Deep inelastic scattering of electrons from protons provided the first direct evidence for the existence of quarks.

Photons

When a photon is the incident particle, there is an inelastic scattering process  called Raman scattering. In this scattering process, the incident photon interacts with matter (gas, liquid, and solid) and the frequency of the photon is shifted towards red or blue. A red shift can be observed when part of the energy of the photon is transferred to the interacting matter, where it adds to its internal energy in a process called Stokes Raman scattering. The blue shift can be observed when internal energy of the matter is transferred to the photon; this process is called anti-Stokes Raman scattering.

Inelastic scattering is seen in the interaction between an electron and a photon. When a high-energy photon collides with a free electron (more precisely, weakly bound since a free electron cannot participate in inelastic scattering with a photon) and transfers energy, the process is called Compton scattering. Furthermore, when an electron with relativistic energy collides with an infrared or visible photon, the electron gives energy to the photon. This  process is called inverse Compton scattering.

Neutrons

Neutrons undergo many types of scattering, including both elastic and inelastic scattering. Whether elastic or inelastic scatter occurs is dependent on the speed of the neutron, whether fast or thermal, or somewhere in between. It is also dependent on the nucleus it strikes and its neutron cross section. In inelastic scattering, the neutron interacts with the nucleus and the kinetic energy of the system is changed. This often activates the nucleus, putting it into an excited, unstable, short-lived energy state which causes it to quickly emit some kind of radiation to bring it back down to a stable or ground state. Alpha, beta, gamma, and protons may be emitted. Particles scattered in this type of nuclear reaction may cause the nucleus to recoil in the other direction.

Molecular collisions
Inelastic scattering is common in molecular collisions. Any collision which leads to a chemical reaction will be inelastic, but the term inelastic scattering is reserved for those collisions which do not result in reactions. There is a transfer of energy between the translational mode (kinetic energy) and rotational and vibrational modes.

If the transferred energy is small compared to the incident energy of the scattered particle, one speaks of quasielastic scattering.

See also 
 Scattering theory
 Elastic scattering

References 

Particle physics
Chemical kinetics
Scattering, absorption and radiative transfer (optics)